Aleksandr Uvarov is the name of:
Aleksandr Uvarov (footballer) (born 1960), Soviet footballer
Aleksandr Uvarov (ice hockey) (1922–1994), Soviet ice hockey player